Gerald Cresswell (4 September 1928 – 15 July 2014) was a South African cricketer. He played four first-class matches for Northerns between 1949 and 1953.

References

External links
 

1928 births
2014 deaths
South African cricketers
Northerns cricketers
Cricketers from Johannesburg